Dalny (Arğı) is a rural locality (a khutor) in Shingak-Kulsky Selsoviet, Chishminsky District, Bashkortostan, Russia. The population was 48 as of 2010. There are 3 streets.

Geography 
Dalny is located 46 km southwest of Chishmy (the district's administrative centre) by road. Verkhny is the nearest rural locality.

References 

Rural localities in Chishminsky District